Montoir-de-Bretagne (literally Montoir of Brittany) is a commune in the Loire-Atlantique department in western France.

Population
The population data given in the table below refer to the commune of Montoir-de-Bretagne in its geography at the given years. In 1913 the commune of Trignac was created from part of Montoir-de-Bretagne, in 1925 Saint-Malo-de-Guersac was created from part of Montoir-de-Bretagne.

See also
 Brière
 Communes of the Loire-Atlantique department

References

Communes of Loire-Atlantique